Foltin is a Macedonian band active since 1995. Their name comes from Karel Čapek's last novel Life and Work of the Composer Foltýn.

Their music is a blend of many genres which include Indie, Alternative, World music, Funk, Electroacoustic, Jazz and other. Foltin's live performances are theatrical and in a "pseudo-immigrant" cabaret style. Journalist Nenad Georgievski describes their music as gravity defying and "dynamic, full of surprises, and humorous—and they blend all sorts of influences together: jazz, improv music, funk, bossa nova, chalgia, klezmer, ambient, and film music." Although rooted in jazz, he states, their music "is not strictly jazz per se, as Foltin frequently blur genre lines, experimenting with a variety of styles and sounds." Singer Branislav Nikolov in a 2009 claimed that his mayor musical influences were Björk, Johnny Cash and Tom Waits.

They have also worked on theatre and film music productions since 1998/1999, including the score for the 92nd Academy Awards for Best International Feature Film and Sundance 2019 awards winner Honeyland. The lyrics of the band's first three albums are a mixture of phonetic imitations of languages including Macedonian, Spanish, French, Romanian, and Portuguese. Over the years, it became a blend of Macedonian and English.

The band has appeared at music and theatre festivals in Macedonia, Croatia, Italy, Austria, Slovenia, Serbia, Bosnia and Herzegovina, Montenegro, Albania, Bulgaria, Hungary, Belgium, England, Germany, Russia, Lebanon, Turkey, the Netherlands, and France.

Band members
Pece Nikolovski - clarinet, harmonica, percussion, effects 
Branislav Nikolov - voice, guitar
Pece Trajkovski - Brada - guitar, accordion, keys and percussion
Goce Jovanoski - bass
Slavco Jovev - drums
Marjan Stanic - percussion

Discography
Outre-Mer (1997)
Archimed (2000)
Donkey Hot (2003)
Lo-Lee-Taa-Too (2005)
Ova Transplantirana masina za čukanje dosega ne tipkala ljubovno pismo (2008)
Penelope X (2011) - joint project with Goce Stevkovski, Emin Dzijan & Nikola Kodjabashia
Antitelo (2012)
Pijan slavej (2015)
МОМÓМА (2019)
Theatre Miniatures (2020)
Simultan Baknezh (2021)

Theater music
2018 – ARABIAN NIGHT, directed by: Zoja Buzalkovska // National Theater 'Voydan Chernodrinski', Prilep, Macedonia
2017 –  Les Misérables, directed by: Martin Kocovski // National Theater 'Voydan Chernodrinski', Prilep, Macedonia
2015 –  LEPA VIDA, directed by: Miha Nemec // SNG Nova Gorica, SSG Trieste, PG Kranj, Slovenija
2015 – THE GOOD PERSON OF SZECHWAN, directed by: Aleksandar Popovski // MGL, Ljubljana, Slovenija
2014 – ŽIVIO HARMS, ČUDA POSTOJE, directed by: Aleksandar Popovski // KEREMPUH, Zagreb, Croatia
2013 – SCHWEIK IIN THE SECOND WORLD WAR, directed by: Martin Kocovski // National Theater 'Voydan Chernodrinski', Prilep, Macedonia
2013 – MISTERIJ BUFFO, directed by: Aleksandar Popovski // SNG Drama, Ljubljana, Slovenia
2012 – ULYSSES, directed by: Aleksandar Popovski // Ulysses Theatre, Brioni, Croatia
2012 – SPRING AWAKENING, directed by: Martin Kocovski // Народно Позориште, Uzice, Serbia
2011 – LEKSIKON OF YU MITOLOGYdirected by: Oliver Frljic // NETA
2011 – BAAL, directed by: Martin Kocovski // Dramski Theater, Skopje, Macedonia
2010 – CIRKUS DESTETIKA, directed by: Aleksandar Popovski // HNK Rijeka, Croatia
2010 – CAUCASIAN CHALK CIRCLE, directed by: Martin Kocovski // National Theater 'Voydan Chernodrinski', Prilep, Macedonia
2010 – PEER GYNT, directed by: Aleksandar Popovski // Gavella, Zagreb, Croatia
2009 – BOAT FOR DOLLS, directed by: Aleksandar Popovski // SNG Drama, Ljubljana, Slovenia
2009 – SWAN SONG, directed by: Branko Stavrev // Dramski Theater, Skopje, Macedonia
2009 – THE OTHER SIDE, directed by: Martin Kocovski // NETA
2008 – DRUMS IN THE NIGHT, directed by: Martin Kocovski // National Theater 'Voydan Chernodrinski', Prilep, Macedonia
2002 – FAMILY STORIES, directed by: Aleksandra Kovacevic // National Theater of Bitola, Macedonia
2002 – DON QUIXOTE IN A DUTCH DISCOTEQUE, directed by: Sasho Milenkovski // National Theater of Kumanovo, Macedonia
2001 – BAKHI, directed by: Sasho Milenkovski // National Theater of Bitola, Macedonia
2001 – Comme Moi LE PIAF, directed by: Natasha Poplavska // National Theater of Bitola, Macedonia
2001 – MACEDOINE, Odyssey 2001, directed by: Ivan Popovski // Ohrid Summer, Ohrid, Macedonia
1999  – MACEDONIAN BLOODY WEDDING, directed by: Ljupcho Georgievski // National Theater of Bitola, Macedonia

Film soundtracks
1998 – BY FOLTIN, directed by Ljubcho Bilbilovski
2001 – SE JAVI!, directed by Jane Altiparmakov
2002 - Okno (short), directed by Petra Seliskar
2005 – Turkish Tea (documentary), directed by Petra Seliskar
2008 – Dance With Me, directed by Sasha A. Damjanovski
2008 – Cash And Marry, directed by Atanas Georgiev
2010 – This Is Not An American Movie, directed by Sasho Pavlovski
2012 – The Balkan is not dead (actors), directed by Aleksandar Popovski
2016 - Lake of Apples, directed by Lubomir Stefanovski
2017 - Secret Ingredient, directed by Gjorce Stavreski
2017 - Avec L'amoure, directed by Ilija Cvetkovski
2019 - Honeyland, directed by Ljubomir Stefanovski i Tamara Kotevska

References

External links
Foltin's Facebook page
Foltin's Instagram page
Foltin at YouTube
Foltin at Bandcamp
Foltin at Discogs

Macedonian rock music groups
Macedonian alternative rock groups
Musical groups established in 1995